William Mynors was an English sea-captain, master of the East India Company (EIC) vessel Royal Mary. His voyage in 1643 discovered Christmas Island on Christmas Day of that year when he sailed past it. Besides this, little is known of Mynors.

Royal Mary served the EIC from 1626 to 1639, and apparently longer.

Citations and references 
Citations

References
Hackman, Rowan (2001) Ships of the East India Company. (Gravesend, Kent: World Ship Society). 

Year of birth unknown
Year of death unknown
British East India Company Marine personnel
English explorers
History of Christmas Island
Place of birth unknown
Place of death unknown
17th-century explorers